Natica tedbayeri is a species of predatory sea snail, a marine gastropod mollusk in the family Naticidae, the moon snails.

Distribution

Description
The maximum recorded shell length is 22 mm.

Habitat
Minimum recorded depth is 0 m. Maximum recorded depth is 50 m.

References

Naticidae
Gastropods described in 1986